Patricia Michelle de León (born in Panama City, Panama) is a Panamanian actress, TV host, model and beauty pageant title holder. She started working as a model at an early age. After being crowned Miss Panama (1995), she hosted La Corte de Familia and La Corte del Pueblo on Telemundo. She was also featured on Juez Franco on TV Azteca, and the Billboard Latino. From her work on Univision, de Leon obtained roles on American TV, including Lincoln Heights, Cold Case, and Crossing Jordan. Her movie role include The Pool Boys (where she plays the Latina Julia).

Early life and education
De Leon was a contestant in Miss Panama (now Señorita Panamá), she finished in third place and was crowned Miss Hispanidad 1995 at 19 years of age. Her debut on TV was doing the weather for a local station in Panama TVN-Channel 2, followed by featuring as an anchor and a reporter for a news program on the same network. She also created, produced and hosted a tourism show for RPC TV/MEDCOM.

She became an actress in Hollywood by accepting the role of "La Llorona del Río". She has been able to pursue both the Hispanic and American market. She has been featured on shows like Cold Case, Crossing Jordan, Lincoln Heights for ABC Family, La Corte del Pueblo for Telemundo, Perro Amor for the same network, and The Chicago Code for Fox Network, and in films like "How the Garcia Girls spent their summer", "All in", "Love Orchard" and "Pool Boys".

Activism 
Patricia de Leon believes is the spokesperson for "One Love Foundation", which defends the rights and fights against the discrimination of the LGBT (Lesbian, Gay, Bisexual, Transgender) Community.
 De Leon is a vegetarian and supports animal rights, she has campaigned against bullfighting.

Filmography 

 La llorona del río (short) (2001) as Esperanza
 A Design for a Life (short) (2001) as The Wife
 La Corte de Familia (TV series) (2001) as Interviewer
 The Master of Disguise (2002) as Waitress
 La Corte del Pueblo (TV series) (2003) as Interviewer
 All of Us (2004, episode: "Wedding Dance") as an Actress
 How the Garcia Girls Spent Their Summer (2005) as soap opera actress
 Drowned Lives (2006) as Policewoman
 All In (2006) as Maria
 Cloud 9 (2006) as Corazon
 Cold Case (2006, episode: "Baby Blues") as Marta Chavez
 Ghost Whisperer (2006, episode: "Drowned Lives") as Policewoman
 Perro amor (23 episodes) as Jennifer Lopez
 Crossing Jordan (2007, episode: "Isolation") as Magda Garcia
 Blue Lake Massacre (2007)
 Lincoln Heights (2007–2009, 4 episodes) as Sofia/Sophia Muñoz
 Juez Franco (TV series) (2008) as Interviewer
 Mr. Sadman (2009) as Maria
 Men of a Certain Age (2009–2011, 6 episodes) as Fantasy woman
 The Pool Boys (2011) as Julia
 The Chicago Code (2011, episode: "Black Hand and the Shotgun Man") as Beatrice Romero
 Fighting for Freedom (2013) as Maria 
 Confessions of a Womanizer (2014) as Patricia
 A Christmas Reunion (2015) as Janette Crowder	
 NCIS (2015, episode: "The Artful Dodger") as Gloria Hernandez	
 Notorious (2016, episode "Kept and Broken") as Silvia Baez	
 Rica, Famosa, Latina (2017, 4 episodes) as herself
 Scorpion (2017) as Lucinda
 A.X.L. (2018) as Joanna Reyes
 Causa Justa (2019)
 The Terminal List (2022) as Paola

References

External links

 
 
 

1978 births
Living people
Señorita Panamá
People from Panama City
Panamanian female models
Panamanian actresses
Panamanian beauty pageant winners
Panamanian emigrants to the United States
Panamanian activists
Panamanian LGBT rights activists